Erika Aleksandrovna Andreeva (born on 24 June 2004) is a Russian tennis player.

In singles, she has been ranked as high as No. 118 by the WTA, on 31 October 2022. Andreeva also has a career-high WTA doubles ranking of world No. 487, achieved on 22 August 2022. She has won three singles titles and one doubles title on the ITF Women's Circuit.

Junior career
Andreeva finished as a runner-up at the 2021 French Open in the girl's singles event. She lost to Linda Nosková in the final.

Career

2020: First ITF title
In November 2020, Andreeva won her first senior ITF Circuit title at the $15k event in Pazardzhik. Just a month later, she won another ITF title, this time at the $15k Cairo. She won third $15k tournament in March 2021.

2022: WTA tour and Grand Slam debut
In May 2022, she played her first significant ITF final, at the $100k+H La Bisbal d'Emporda, but lost despite winning first set.

Andreeva made her WTA Tour debut at the 2022 Ladies Open Lausanne, after passing the qualifying. There she recorded her first WTA Tour-level win after dropping only three games against Anna Blinkova in the first round.

She made her Grand Slam debut at the 2022 US Open, winning three qualifying matches to earn a spot in the main draw.

2023

Ranked No. 135 at the inaugural 2023 ATX Open in Austin, Texas, she reached the main draw as lucky loser and won the longest match of the season so far against Harriet Dart lasting three hours and 32 minutes. Next she lost to Anna-Lena Friedsam in another more the three hours match.

Personal life
Her sister Mirra Andreeva is also a tennis player. They are both from Krasnoyarsk, but moved to Moscow for coaching.

Performance timeline

Singles
Current after the 2023 ATX Open.

ITF finals

Singles: 6 (3 titles, 3 runner–ups)

Doubles: 2 (1 title, 1 runner–up)

Junior career

Grand Slam finals

Girls' singles: 1 runner–up

Notes

References

External links
 
 

2004 births
Living people
Russian female tennis players
21st-century Russian women
People from Krasnoyarsk